Mountain cranberry is a common name for several plants and may refer to:

 Another name for bearberries, three species of dwarf shrubs in the genus Arctostaphylos
 Vaccinium vitis-idaea, a small evergreen shrub widely distributed in the Northern Hemisphere
 Vaccinium erythrocarpum, a deciduous shrub native to the southeastern United States